The canton of Guémené-Penfao is an administrative division of the Loire-Atlantique department, western France. Its borders were modified at the French canton reorganisation which came into effect in March 2015. Its seat is in Guémené-Penfao.

It consists of the following communes:
 
Abbaretz
La Chevallerais
Conquereuil
Derval
La Grigonnais
Guémené-Penfao
Jans
Lusanger
Marsac-sur-Don
Massérac
Mouais
Nozay
Pierric
Puceul
Saffré
Saint-Vincent-des-Landes
Sion-les-Mines
Treffieux
Vay

References

Cantons of Loire-Atlantique